List of the published work of Paul Theroux, American novelist, short story writer and travel writer.

Novels
 
 Fong and the Indians (1968)
 Girls at Play (1969)
 Murder in Mount Holly (1969)
 Jungle Lovers (1971)
 Saint Jack (1973)
 The Black House (1974)
 The Family Arsenal (1976)
 Picture Palace (1978)
 A Christmas Card (1978)
 London Snow (1980)
 The Mosquito Coast (1981)
 Doctor Slaughter (1984) – filmed as Half Moon Street (1986)
 
 
 Chicago Loop (1990)
 Dr. DeMarr (1990)
 Millroy the Magician (1993)
 The Greenest Island (1995)
 My Other Life (1996)
 Kowloon Tong (1997)
 Hotel Honolulu (2001)
 Nurse Wolf and Dr. Sacks (2001)
 Blinding Light (2006)
 A Dead Hand: A Crime in Calcutta (2009)
 The Lower River (2012)
 Mother Land (2017)
Under the Wave at Waimea (2021)
 The Bad Angel Brothers (2022)

Short fiction 
Collections
 Sinning with Annie (1972)
 The Consul's File (1977)
 World's End (1980)
 The London Embassy (1982)
 
 Stranger at the Palazzo D'Oro (2004)
 The Elephanta Suite (2007)
 Mr. Bones (2014) 

Stories

Non-fiction

Miscellaneous non-fiction

 V. S. Naipaul: An Introduction to his Work (1972)
 Sir Vidia's Shadow (1998)

Travel

The Great Railway Bazaar (1975)
The Old Patagonian Express (1979)
The Kingdom by the Sea (1983)
Sailing Through China (1984)
Sunrise with Seamonsters (1985)
The Imperial Way (1985)
Patagonia Revisited, with Bruce Chatwin (1985)
Riding the Iron Rooster (1988)
To the Ends of the Earth (Compilation of travel writing, 1990)
Travelling The World - The Illustrated Travels of Paul Theroux (1990)
The Happy Isles of Oceania (1992)
The Pillars of Hercules (1995)
Fresh Air Fiend (2000)
Dark Star Safari (2002)
Ghost Train to the Eastern Star (2008)
The Tao of Travel (2011)
The Last Train to Zona Verde (2013)
Deep South: Four Seasons on Back Roads (2015)
Figures in a Landscape: People and Places (2018)
 On the Plain of Snakes: A Mexican Journey (2019)

Notes

External links

Bibliographies by writer
Bibliographies of American writers
Works by Paul Theroux